The 1973 Ole Miss Rebels football team represented the University of Mississippi (Ole Miss) during the 1973 NCAA Division I football season as a member of the Southeastern Conference (SEC). The team was led by head coach Billy Kinard, in his third year, for the first three games and then by Johnny Vaught, in his 25th year, for their last eight games. The Rebels played their home games at Hemingway Stadium in Oxford, Mississippi and Mississippi Veterans Memorial Stadium in Jackson, Mississippi. They finished the season with a record of six wins and five losses (6–5, 4–3 SEC).

Schedule

Personnel

References

Ole Miss
Ole Miss Rebels football seasons
Ole Miss Rebels football